
Year 93 BC was a year of the pre-Julian Roman calendar. At the time it was known as the Year of the Consulship of Flaccus and Herennius (or, less frequently, year 661 Ab urbe condita). The denomination 93 BC for this year has been used since the early medieval period, when the Anno Domini calendar era became the prevalent method in Europe for naming years.

Events 
 By place 

 Roman republic 
 Roman consuls: Gaius Valerius Flaccus and Marcus Herennius.

 Asia Minor 
 Ariobarzanes I Philoromaios becomes king of Cappadocia with Roman backing.
 Arshak I becomes king of Caucasian Iberia after overthrowing Farnadjom.

 Asia 
 End of era Taishi of Emperor Wu of Han China.

Births 
Publius Clodius Pulcher, Roman politician (d. 52 BC)

Deaths 
 Antiochus XI, king of the Seleucid Empire
 Farnadjom, king of Caucasian Iberia

References